Dark Garden may refer to:
 Dark Garden, a park in Narva, Estonia
 "The Dark Garden", a novel by Mignon G. Eberhart